Hammock House (also known as Blackbeard's House) is a historic house in Beaufort, North Carolina that is one of the oldest houses in the state.

The house is believed to be constructed in the early eighteenth century (circa 1700) and is a prominent example of West Indies architecture. There is a tradition that the pirate, Blackbeard (Edward Teach), stayed in the house in the eighteenth century while it was serving as an inn. In the nineteenth century, "[t]he house was used by the Union Army during the Civil War including a company of "Buffaloes" or Southerners who joined the Union forces." On December 15, 2009, the house was featured on Episode 1.11 of Ghost Lab for its connection to Blackbeard.

References

See also
List of the oldest buildings in North Carolina

Houses in Carteret County, North Carolina